Cathy Wolfe (born August 31, 1944) is an American politician who served as a member of the Thurston County Board of County Commissioners from 2001 to 2017 and a member of the Washington House of Representatives from 1993 to 2001.  In the legislature, she represented Washington's 22nd legislative district as a Democrat.  During her final term in the legislature, she served as the Democratic whip from 1999 to 2001.

References

External links
 Member biography on Washington State Legislature website
 Article discussing decision not to seek reelection in 2016

1944 births
Living people
Democratic Party members of the Washington House of Representatives
People from Thurston County, Washington
Women state legislators in Washington (state)